Raymar Reimers (born 10 December 1940) is a German boxer. He competed in the men's light heavyweight event at the 1968 Summer Olympics. At the 1968 Summer Olympics, he lost to Ion Monea of Romania.

References

External links
 

1940 births
Living people
German male boxers
Olympic boxers of West Germany
Boxers at the 1968 Summer Olympics
People from Stormarn (district)
Light-heavyweight boxers
Sportspeople from Schleswig-Holstein